Gunville may refer to:

Gunville, a settlement on the Isle of Wight
Gunville, West Virginia, an unincorporated community in Mason County

See also
Tarrant Gunville, a village and civil parish in north Dorset, England